This is a list of notable home video companies in the business of producing and marketing pre-recorded cassettes and discs of various formats for home video.

Major home video companies

Paramount Global

Paramount Home Entertainment (1976–present)
Nickelodeon Home Video (1994–present)
Nick Jr. Video (1994–2006)
 Nick Jr. DVD (2001–present)
MTV Home Video (1994–present)
Comedy Central Home Video (1998–present)
PBS Distribution (2004-2011)
BET Home Entertainment (2007–present)
Miramax Home Entertainment (1994–present)
Miramax/Dimension Home Entertainment (1995–present)
Republic Pictures Home Video (1985–1998)
NTA Home Entertainment (1983-1985)
Spotlight Video (1984–1986)
Worldvision Home Video (1982–1995)
CBS Home Entertainment (2006–present)
CBS Video Enterprises (1979–1982)
MGM/CBS Home Video (1980–1982) 
CBS/Fox Video (1982–2001, only includes content licensed by CBS)
CBS Video (1980–2006)
CBS DVD (1999–present)

Warner Bros. Discovery

Warner Bros. Home Entertainment (2017–present)
Warner Home Video (1980–2017)
WCI Home Video (1978–1980)
Studio Distribution Services (Warner Bros. & Universal Joint Venture) (2021–present)
New Line Home Entertainment (2001–2010)
New Line Home Video (1991–2001)
Infinifilm (2002–2007)
HBO Home Entertainment (2010–2020)
Thorn EMI Video (1981–1985)
Thorn EMI/HBO Video (1985–1986)
HBO/Cannon Video (1986–1987)
HBO Video (1987–2010)
Karl-Lorimar Home Video (1985–1989)
MGM (1990–1999, 2020–present)
Paramount Pictures (2013–2017)
Turner Home Entertainment (1986–1999)
Hanna-Barbera Home Video (1987–1993)
PBS Distribution (1994-2004)
 WarnerVision Entertainment (1995–2002)
 KidVision (1990–2004)
Discovery Channel Video (1987–present)
TLC Video (1972–present)
Animal Planet Video (1983–present)

The Walt Disney Company

Walt Disney Studios Home Entertainment (1988–present)
Disney (2012–present) 
ABC Signature (2007–present)
ABC Video (1997–1999)
Buena Vista Home Entertainment (1984–2010, remains in use as a label in other countries)
Touchstone Home Entertainment (1984–2016)
Hollywood Pictures Home Entertainment (1990–2007)
DIC Toon-Time Video (1994–2000, US only)
ESPN Home Entertainment (1997–present)
Freeform (2007–present)
Jim Henson Video (1993–1996)
Marvel Studios (2012–present)
Lucasfilm (2014–present)
20th Century Studios Home Entertainment (2019–present)
Blue Sky Studios (2002–2023)
Magnetic Video (1968–1982)
CBS/Fox Video (1982–2001, included content licensed by CBS before 2000)
Key Video/Key DVD (1984–2005) 
Playhouse Video (1985–1990)
Fox Video (1991–1998)
20th Century Fox Home Entertainment (1995–2020)
HIT Entertainment (2006-2008)
DreamWorks Animation (2013–2017)
Entertainment One (2016-2019)
MGM (2006–2020)
New World Video (1984–1989)
MTM Home Video (1992–1997)
Miramax Home Entertainment (1994–2010)
Miramax/Dimension Home Entertainment (1995–2006)
Dimension Home Entertainment (1995–2005)
Muppet Home Video (1983–1985, US only)

Sony

Sony Pictures Home Entertainment (2004–present)
Sony Video Software (1979–1992)
Columbia Pictures Home Entertainment (1978–present)
RCA/Columbia Pictures Home Video (1982–1991)
Columbia TriStar Home Video (1991–2001)
Columbia TriStar Home Entertainment (2001–2005)
 Crunchyroll, LLC (2017–present)
Sony Music Entertainment (1991–2005, 2008–present)
Sony BMG Music Entertainment (2004–2009)
Sony Music Video Enterprises (1991–2005)
Nickelodeon Home Video (1993–present)
Nick Jr. Video (1995–present)
MTV Home Video (1994–present)
Sony Wonder (1992–2007)
Nickelodeon Home Video (1993–2006)
Nick Jr. Video (1995–2006)
Golden Book Video (1993-1996)/Golden Books Family Entertainment (1996-2002)
Random House Home Video (1994–2006)
Golden Books Family Entertainment (2001-2005)
Children's Television Workshop (1995-2000)/Sesame Workshop (2000-2007)
Classic Media (2000-2007)
Golden Books Family Entertainment (2001-2007)
BMG Video (1987–2008)
BMG Kidz (1990–2008)

Comcast

Universal Pictures Home Entertainment (1997–present)
MCA DiscoVision (1977–1981)
MCA Videocassette, Inc. (1980–1983)
MCA Videodisc (1981–1983)
MCA Home Video (1983–1990)
MCA/Universal Home Video (1990–1998)
HIT Entertainment (2014–2017)/Mattel Creations (2016–2019)/Mattel Television (2019–2021)
Entertainment One (2019–present)
NBC Home Video (1981–2000)
USA Home Entertainment (1999–2002)
PolyGram Video (1982–1999)
Studio Distribution Services (Universal & Warner Bros. Joint Venture) (2021–present)
Universal Sony Pictures Home Entertainment Australia (Universal Pictures, Sony Pictures & Paramount Pictures Joint Venture)
Metro-Goldwyn-Mayer (2018–present)
Summit Entertainment (2007–2014)
DreamWorks Home Entertainment (1997–present, minority owner)
DreamWorks Animation Home Entertainment (2004–present)
Golden Book Video (1985–1996)/Golden Books Family Entertainment (1996-2008)
Classic Media (2000-2012)/DreamWorks Classics (2012-present)

Lions Gate Entertainment Corporation
Note: Additional video companies whose libraries have been acquired by Lionsgate will be marked with an (*) in the "Other Companies" section; as documented in the Lionsgate Home Entertainment and Anchor Bay Entertainment articles or external references.

Lionsgate Home Entertainment (1999–present)
Summit Entertainment (1991–present)
LeapFrog (2003–2015)
Artisan Entertainment (1983–2005, formerly U.S.A. Home Video, International Video Entertainment, Inc. and Live Entertainment)
Family Home Entertainment (1980–2007)
Family Home Entertainment Kids (1998–2004)
FHE Pictures (2002)
Live Entertainment
International Video Entertainment
Discovery Channel Video
TLC Video
Animal Planet Video
Sonar Entertainment
Hallmark Home Entertainment
Hallmark Hall of Fame
Carolco Home Video (1990–1995)
Avid Home Entertainment (1991–1998)
Vestron Video (1982–1992)
Children's Video Library (1982–1989)
Lightning Video (1982–1989)
HIT Entertainment (2008-2014)
Starz Home Entertainment (2007-2008, 2016–2017)
Anchor Bay Entertainment (1995–2017)
GTS Records (19??-1995)
Drive Entertainment (19??-1995)
Starmaker Entertainment (1988–1998)
R&G Video (1990–1998)
Video Treasures (1985–1998)
MNTEX Entertainment (1986–1993)
Teal Entertainment (198?–1995)
Strand Home Video (1990–1993)
Burbank Video (1989–1994, second incarnation)
SRO Video (1981–1982)
Opening Night Productions (1982–1984)
Curtain Call Video (1984–1985)
Video Classics (1985–1986)
Viking Video Classics (1986–1988)
Troy Gold (1988–1989)
Burbank Video (1983–1989, first incarnation)

MGM Holdings (Amazon)

MGM Home Entertainment (1998–present)
MGM Home Video (1978–1980)
MGM/CBS Home Video (1980–1982)
MGM/UA Home Video (1982–1998)
UA (Specials)
Cannon Video (1985–1995)
Embassy Home Entertainment (1982–1998)
Samuel Goldwyn Home Entertainment (1982–1997)
Orion Home Video (1987–1998)
Filmways Home Video (1988–1989)
Streamline Video (1990–1994)

Warner Music Group

Warner Music Vision (1990–2006)
KidVision (1990–2004)
BodyVision (1993–2002)
Warner Reprise Video (1986–present)
Rhino Entertainment (1978–present)

Others

Heron Communications	
Media Home Entertainment (1978–1993)*
Hi-Tops Video (1984–1993)*
The Nostalgia Merchant (1978–1989)*
Fox Hills Video (1986–1989)*
Taurus Entertainment (1981–present)*
PBS Distribution (1977–present)
2 Entertain (1984–present)
DIC Home Entertainment (2001–2009, distributed by Lionsgate Home Entertainment before 2002, Sterling Entertainment Group between 2002 and 2006, and NCircle Entertainment after 2006)
DIC Video (1985–1994, distributed by RCA/Columbia Pictures Home Video before 1986, GoodTimes Home Video after 1989 and Golden Book Video from 1986 to 1989)
DIC Toon-Time Video (1991–2001, distributed by BMG Video before 1993 and Buena Vista Home Video after 1993)
WGBH Boston Video (1980–present)
Random House Home Video (1983–2006, 2008-2009)
Golden Book Video (1985–2008)
Roadshow Entertainment (1982–present)
Wizard Video (1980–present)*
Viz Video (1993–present)
Nine Network
HIT Entertainment (1996–present in the United Kingdom, 1998–2016 in the United States)
Lyrick Studios (1988–2001)
Shout! Factory (2002–present)
Geffen Home Video (1992–1998)
NCircle Entertainment (2006–present)
Genius Products (1996–2011)
NoShame
Hemdale Home Video (1991–1995)
Fries Home Video
Maxell
The Criterion Collection
Image Entertainment
Entertainment One (2005–present)
Vivendi Entertainment (2004–2013)
Time Life Video
New Video Group (1991–present)
Monterey Home Video (Caballero-era library owned by Lionsgate)
Broad Green Pictures
Prism Entertainment (1983–1997)
Big Things Home Entertainment (1990-2009) 
Country-and-Date Home Video (1990-2006)
Underwater Map Video later changed to Underwater Map DVD (2001)
Arriving Flight Home Entertainment (2002-2009)
Once upon a Time Video

Public domain companies

Simitar Entertainment (1985–2000)
GoodTimes Entertainment(1984-2005)/GT Media (2003–present)
 Kids Klassics Home Video (1985–1996)
 GTK, Inc. (1987–1990)
 California Video Distributors (1984–1986)
Sterling Entertainment Group (1992–2006)
VidAmerica (1979–1992)
 UAV Corporation (1984–1998)
Celebrity Home Entertainment (1987–2001)
 Celebrity Video (1985–1987)
 Celebrity's Just for Kids Home Video (1989–2001)
 Unicon Communications (1989–1992)
Vee-Jay Video Products (1986–1989)
Concord Video (1985–1987)
Burbank Video (1985–1994)*
 Troy Gold (1988–1989)*
Diamond Entertainment Corporation (1991–present)
 Trans-Atlantic Video (1985–1991)
Madacy Entertainment (1993–2007)
Echo Bridge Home Entertainment (2001–present)
Platinum Disc Corporation (1995–2006)
MPI Home Video (1984–present)
Alpha Video (1991–present)
 New Age Video (1985–1991)
Westlake Entertainment (2001–2009)
Digiview Entertainment (2004–2008)

Adult video companies
Caballero Home Video (1981–1989)

Outside of the United States 
 Argentina

LK-TEL
Gativideo 
Argentina Video Home
Transmundo Home Video
Transeuropa Video Entertainment
Teleargentina Division Video
Live Video
Lucian Films
Plus Video
American Video
Emerald
Tauro Video
Radiocom Video
Target Video Home
Madison Video Home
FAX Video Design

- Argentinian in Chilean Spanish / Hispanoamérica

Video Chile: ADV Garantía Original Video (also known as Video Chile in PAL Standard (HI-FI Stereo) (1986–present)
Video Chile: Video Colección (in PAL Standard (HI-FI Stereo) (1986–present)
Walt Disney Studios Home Entertainment Argentina, Latin America / Buena Vista Home Entertainment Argentina, Latin America (1986–present)
Touchstone Home Entertainment Argentina, Latin America (1986–2017)
Hollywood Pictures Home Video Argentina, Latin America (1986–2007)
20th Century Studios Home Entertainment Argentina, Latin America (1986–present)
MGM Home Entertainment Argentina, Latin America (1986–present)
Warner Bros. Home Entertainment Argentina, Latin America (1986–present)
Warner Bros. Family Entertainment (Warner Home Video) Argentina, Latin America (1986–2009)
Turner Home Entertainment Argentina, Latin America (1995–1999)
Hanna-Barbera Home Video Argentina, Latin America (1995–1999)
Universal Studios Home Entertainment Argentina, Latin America (1986–present)
Paramount Pictures Home Entertainment Argentina, Latin America (1986–present)
DreamWorks Home Entertainment Argentina, Latin America (1999–2011)
DreamWorks Animation Home Entertainment Argentina, Latin America (1999–2014)
Columbia TriStar Home Entertainment Argentina, Latin America (1986–2005)
Sony Pictures Home Entertainment Argentina, Latin America (2005–present)

 Australia

Communications and Entertainment Limited (Early 1980s-Mid 1990s, was originally Publishing and Broadcasting Video Distribution)
GO Video (Early-Mid 1980s)
Starbase Video (Early-Mid 1980s)
King of Video (Early-Mid 1980s)
Video Classics (Early-Mid 1980s)
Thorn/EMI Video
Thorn/EMI HBO Video
Platinum Video (Mid-1980s)
Delta Home Video (Mid-1980s)
Prestige Video (Mid-1980s)
Palace Home Video (Mid-Late 1980s)
Roadshow Entertainment (1995–)
Roadshow Home Video (1982–1995)
Intervision (Early-Mid 1980s)
ABC Video (1984–)
Family Home Entertainment (1985–1991)
Showcase Video (Mid-1980s)
GL Video (Early-1980s)
Vestron (Mid-Late 1980s)
Box Office Int. Video (Mid-1980s)
RCA/Columbia Pictures/Hoyts Video (Mid-Late 1980s)
Videoscope (Early 1980s)
Syme Home Video (Mid 1980s)
Electric (Blue) Video (although the company was actually UK-based)
Sports World Cinema
VCL Video
Movies at Midnight
Seven Keys Video
Screen Time Entertainment (division of CBS-Fox Video in Australia)
Pink Video
Rigby-CIC Video
Merlin Video
Playaround Video
Star Video
Australian Video
Madman Entertainment
21st Century Pictures
Electric Blue

 Bulgaria

Alexandra Video
May Star Film
Audio Video Orpheus
IP Video
Multi Video Center
Tandem Video
Bulgarian Video

 Brazil

America Video
Poletel Video
China Video
LK-TEL Video
Abril Video

 Canada

A and Y Productions (2003–2006)
The ABM Group (1989–1994) (Canadian subsidiary of Starmaker Entertainment (before 1994))
Berserk Cow Productions (2006–present)
HGV Video Productions (1989–2002, Canadian subsidiary of GoodTimes Entertainment (before 1997), Burbank Video, Video Treasures, Starmaker Entertainment (after 1994) and Media Home Entertainment (after 1989))*
Astral Video (Mid 1985–1996)
Cineplex Odeon Home Video (1985–1998)
Vidtex Video
Media West, Inc. (Low-budget Canadian counterpart of Worldvision Home Video)
Behavior Communications (1997–2001)
C/FP Distribution
Cineglobe
Malofilm Video (1983–1997)
Nova Home Video (1987–1992)
Alliance Releasing
Video MPA
Metrodome Distribution (2003–2005)
Montevideo Limited (1989–1993)
Canadian Video Factory (1984–1987)
Junior Home Video (Children's sublabel of Canadian Video Factory (later changed to Nova Home Video))
Imavision
BFS Video (distributor of old BBC and ITV programs from the UK)
La mouche et l'elephant/PR Vidéo (French-language)

 Catalan

VideoCine (in PAL Standard (HI-FI Stereo) (1986–present)
VideoCine: Video Colecțiile (in PAL Standard (HI-FI Stereo) (1986–present)
Walt Disney Studios Home Entertainment Catalá / Buena Vista Home Entertainment Catalá (1986–present)
Touchstone Home Entertainment Catalá (1986–2017)
Hollywood Pictures Home Video Catalá (1986–2007)
20th Century Studios Home Entertainment Catalá (1986–present)
MGM Home Entertainment Catalá (1986–present)
Warner Bros. Home Entertainment Catalá (1986–present)
Warner Bros. Family Entertainment (Warner Home Video) Catalá (1986–2009)
Turner Home Entertainment Catalá (1995–1999)
Hanna-Barbera Home Video Catalá (1995–1999)
Universal Studios Home Entertainment Catalá (1986–present)
Paramount Pictures Home Entertainment Catalá (1986–present)
DreamWorks Home Entertainment Catalá (1999–2011)
DreamWorks Animation Home Entertainment Catalá (1999–2014)
Columbia TriStar Home Entertainment Catalá (1986–2005)
Sony Pictures Home Entertainment Catalá (2005–present)

 Colombia

Kyron Home Video
Cinevideo
Contacto Video
Video Presidente
Magnum Video S.A
Video Factory Ltda.
Venue Home Video Ltda.
Alfavideo
Video Hit S.A
Condor Video
Cine Colombia Video
Producciones Hollywood

 Chile

Cinecolor Films
Transvideo
Argentina Video Home – LAHE
Video Chile

 Denmark

Video Action
Filmlab Video
Sandrew Metronome
Starbox Video

 Finland

Magnum Video (no relation to the low-budget B-movie label now owned by Lions Gate)
Nordic Video
Capitol Video (released several films from the former Soviet Union)
Sandrew Metronome

 France

StudioCanal Video
Gaumont/Columbia-TriStar Home Video (1993–1998)
Gaumont/Columbia Films/RCA Video (1982–1989)
Gaumont/Columbia Pictures/RCA Video (1989–1993)
Delta Video
UGC Video
Fil-à-Film
New Family Video
TF1 Video
Carrére Video
Sunrise
Initial Home Video
Mondial Home Video
Régie Cassette Video
Challenge Video Productions

 Germany

Kiddinx Video
RTL Video
VPS Video Programme Service
Atlas Film Video
ITT-Contrast Video
Select Video
UFA Video
All Video
EuroVideo
SuperVideo

 Greece

Key Video Production (1980s–1990s)
AGM Home Video
Hellas Kosmos Video
Hi-Tech Video
Original Video
Video Acropolis
Video City International
Videosonic (one of the biggest Greek home video companies, started in the mid-1980s through 2008)
Zodiac Video (1984–2012)
MTC Video (1983–)
Olympic Video
Master Video Home
AudioVisual Enterprise
AudioVisual Home Video
Nea Kinisi Video

 Hong Kong

Ocean Shores Video (1975–)
Intercontinental Video Ltd. (1981–)
Deltamac (HK) Co., Ltd. (1992–)
Universe Laser & Video Co., Ltd. (1986–)
Mei Ah Entertainment (1984–)

 India

Eagle Home Entertainment
Excel Home Entertainment
Shemaroo
Ultra
Moser Baer
Time
T-Series (Super Cassettes Industries Ltd.)

 Italy

Torino Video
Medusa Video
Fonit Cetra Video
Ricordi Video
RaroVideo
CG Entertainment
Koch Media Italia
Walt Disney Studios Home Entertainment Italia
Warner Bros. Entertainment Italia
Universal Pictures Italia
01 Distribution Home Video
Eagle Home Video
Luckyred Homevideo

 Latina

Video.com (in PAL Standard (HI-FI Stereo) (1986–present)
Video.com: Video Collectiones (in PAL Standard (HI-FI Stereo) (1986–present)
Walt Disney Studios Home Entertainment Latina / Buena Vista Home Entertainment Latina (1986–present)
Touchstone Home Entertainment Latina (1986–2017)
Hollywood Pictures Home Video Latina (1986–2007)
20th Century Studios Home Entertainment Latina (1986–present)
MGM Home Entertainment Latina (1986–present)
Warner Bros. Home Entertainment Latina (1986–present)
Warner Bros. Family Entertainment (Warner Home Video) Latina (1986–2009)
Turner Home Entertainment Latina (1995–1999)
Hanna-Barbera Home Video Latina (1995–1999)
Universal Home Entertainment Latina (1986–present)
Paramount Pictures Home Entertainment Latina (1986–present)
DreamWorks Home Entertainment Latina (1999–2011)
DreamWorks Animation Home Entertainment Latina (1999–2014)
Columbia TriStar Home Entertainment Latina (1986–2005)
Sony Pictures Home Entertainment Latina (2005–present)

 Japan

Bandai Visual – Emotion (1983–)
Japan Home Video
Kadokawa Video
Clarion/CLS Video
Shogakukan Video
Pony Video (dates unknown)
Toei Home Video (?-Present)
Shochiku Home Video (?-Present)
Toho Video
Tohokushinsha Home Video

 Mexico

Televisa Home Entertainment (dates unknown)
Video Emoción (1980s-Early 1990s)
VideoVisa

 The Netherlands

Converge Video (1980s)
Video Screen
Eagle 6 Video
Bridge Entertainment DVD
Classic Video Movies
Video Garant
European Video Corporation

 Norway

ABC Video (1980s)
Big Partner (1980s)
CCV (Club Consult Video) (1980s)
C.P. Entertainment (1980s)
Fram Film (1980s)
HVC Video Vision AS (1980s)
Intervideo (1980s)
In Video (1980s)
JEL Video (1980s)
Mayco AS (1980s)
Nord Video (1980s)
Novio AS (Later renamed "Nye Novio") (1980s)
OVC (Oslo Video Center) (1980s)
Panorama (1980s)
Sandrew Metronome
Screen Entertainment (1980s)
VCM (1980s)
Videohuset (1980s)

 Philippines

C-Interactive Digital Entertainment
Magnavision Home Video
Solar Entertainment
Warner Home Video Philippines
Star Home Video (Star Records Video)
Regal Home Video (Regal International Inc.)
Trigon Video
Ivory Music & Video
Paragon Home Video
Synergy Home Entertainment
Aquarius Records
Viva Video

 Romania

VideoCine (in PAL Standard (HI-FI Stereo) (1986–present)
VideoCine: Video Colecția (in PAL Standard (HI-FI Stereo) (1986–present)
Walt Disney Studios Home Entertainment România / Buena Vista Home Entertainment România (1986–present)
Touchstone Home Entertainment România (1986–2017)
Hollywood Pictures Home Video România (1986–2007)
20th Century Studios Home Entertainment România (1986–present)
MGM Home Entertainment România (1986–present)
Warner Bros. Home Entertainment România (1986–present)
Warner Bros. Family Entertainment (Warner Home Video) România (1986–2009)
Turner Home Entertainment România (1995–1999)
Hanna-Barbera Home Video România (1995–1999)
Universal Studios Home Entertainment România (1986–present)
Paramount Pictures Home Entertainment România (1986–present)
DreamWorks Home Entertainment România (1999–2011)
DreamWorks Animation Home Entertainment România (1999–2014)
Columbia TriStar Home Entertainment România (1986–2005)
Sony Pictures Home Entertainment România (2005–present)

 Russia

20th Century Fox CIS (2006–2015)
Big Plan (1988–)
CP Digital (until 2012 renamed as «CP Distribution») (2000–2015)
Gemini Film (2000–2007)
Most Video (1999–2005)
Premier Video Film (1996–2005)
Premier Multimedia (2001–2005)
Pyramid Home Video (1997–2008)
New Disk/ND Play (2000s-)
Union Video (1988–2012)
VideoServis (1994–2015)
Varus Video (1992–2000)
West Multimedia/West Video (1994–2015)
Walt Disney Company CIS (2008–)
Universal Pictures Rus (2005–2011)
Lazer Video

 Portugal

RTP Home Video
Class Vidéo (????)
Club Privé Vidéo (1992–present)
The Video Bancorp
NOS
LNKVideo
Cinemateca Portuguesa
PRIS Audiovisuais
Skookum Films

 Saudi Arabia

ALMONTAGE Entertainment (2009)
Video Master (1990s)

 Singapore

Videovan Entertainment (1997–2011)
Poh Kim Video (????)
Melovision Trading Corporation

 South Africa

Nu Metro Home Entertainment (1987–)
Ster-Kinekor Home Video (1993–)

South Korea

 Kwang Young Products
 Home Game
 Korea Media
 Cinematown

 Spain

Filmax Home Video (1988–present)
Video Diversíon (Mid-1980s)
Lauren Films Video (1980s-Present)
Vadimon Video
SAV
Viva Home Video (1980s)
Video Colección (1990s, Spain's version of The Video Collection/Strand-VCI Entertainment/Strand Home Video)

 Sweden

Baroness VideoVision
International Promotions, Inc.
PRT Elektronik
Trix Videofilmer
Video Invest
Videce Videocentralen
Mariann Video
Esselte Video
Walthers Video
Sandrew Metronome

 Turkey

Alparslan Video

 United Kingdom

CIC Video (1980–1999)
RCA/Columbia Pictures International Video (1982–1992)
Vestron Video International (1987–1991)
Abbey Home Media Group (2002–2020)
Abbey Home Entertainment/Tempo Video
Video Gems (1986–1996)
Guild Home Video (1980–1997)
RPTA Video (1981–1984)
Thorn EMI Video UK (1981–1986)
Cannon Video UK (1986–1989)
Telstar Home Entertainment (2000s)
2 Entertain (2004–)
BBC Home Entertainment (1980–)
Video Collection International (1984–2004)
Cinema Club
Astrion (a Division of Vision Video LTD.) (1995–1999)
Acorn Media
HIT Entertainment (1997–present)
Metrodome Distribution (2003–2009)
M.I.A. Video
IMC Video LTD
Pegasus Entertainment
Castle Vision
Screen Legends
First Independent Films
Braveworld Video
Virgin Video
Channel 5 Video
ITV Studios Global Entertainment
Pickwick Video Group
Carlton Video (1995–2004)
Granada Ventures (2005–2006)
ITV DVD (2006–2009)
ITV Studios (2009–present)
Entertainment in Video (EIV)
Magical Video Movies (MVM)
Dazzler Media
Entertainment One (2007–present)
Contender Entertainment Group (1994–2009)
Bonkers
Nippers
 Kult TV/Kult Kidz
Rubber Duck Entertainment (2005–2009)
Medusa Video (1980s–2004)
Hong Kong Legends (1999–2007)
Momentum Pictures (2000–2013)
First Choice Home Video
Marshall Media (1931)
Spirit Entertainment
Kaleidoscope Home Entertainment
Palace Video (Note: unrelated to the Australian company of the same name, this handled children's videos & horror movies)
Signature Entertainment (2012–present)
DD Video
Replay Video
Hokushin Video Movies
Intervision
Alpha Video
Videomedia
Skyline Video
Prism Leisure Corporation
Odyssey Video
Video Program Distribution
Derann Video
Vision Video LTD. (1993–2003)
Cherrywood Entertainment
LaserLight Digital
CineHollywood
Longman Video
Thames Video

 Venezuela

Blancic Video
Videorama
Venevista Video
Video-Rodven
Gran Video
Video Venus
Videos De Venezuela
Blue Diamond Video
Intervideo
Romy Video

See also

Home video
:Category:Home video by year
Videocassette recorder
Copyright law
Video rental shop
:Category:Video
:Category:Direct-to-video film series
:Category:Home video companies of the United States
Home cinema

References

Home video
Home video companies